Henry Tozer may refer to:

Henry Tozer (priest) (1602–1650), English priest and academic
Henry Fanshawe Tozer (1829–1916), English writer, teacher, and traveler